Matías Sebastián García (born 11 November 1980) was an Argentine footballer. His last club was Andes Talleres.

References
 

1980 births
Living people
Argentine footballers
Argentine expatriate footballers
Atlético Tucumán footballers
Ferro Carril Oeste footballers
Huracán de Tres Arroyos footballers
San Martín de San Juan footballers
Monagas S.C. players
C.D. Huachipato footballers
Expatriate footballers in Chile
Expatriate footballers in Latvia
Expatriate footballers in Venezuela
Association football midfielders
Sportspeople from Mendoza, Argentina